Neil Cohn (born 1980) is an American cognitive scientist and comics theorist. His research offers the first serious scientific study of the cognition of understanding comics, and uses an interdisciplinary approach combining aspects of theoretical and corpus linguistics with cognitive psychology and cognitive neuroscience.

Cohn’s work argues that common cognitive capacities underlie the processing of various expressive domains, especially verbal and signed languages and what he calls “visual language”—the structure and cognition of drawings and visual narratives, particularly those found in comics. His 2020 book, Who Understands Comics? explored the proficiency required to understand visual narratives, and was nominated for a 2021 Eisner Award for Best Academic/Scholarly Work. His theories on visual language provided the foundation for the creation of automatically generated news comics for the BBC.

Cohn's research has also examined the comprehension and linguistic status of emoji. He has also helped propose and design several emoji.

Biography
Cohn began developing his theories as an undergraduate at UC Berkeley where he graduated in 2002. He then spent several years as an independent scholar before studying under linguist Ray Jackendoff and psychologists Gina Kuperberg and Phillip Holcomb at Tufts University where he received his PhD in psychology in 2012. He then did a postdoctoral fellowship at UC San Diego working with Marta Kutas and Jeff Elman. In 2016, he joined the faculty of the Tilburg center for Cognition and Communication at Tilburg University. He is the son of Leigh Cohn and Lindsey Hall.

Visual language theory
Cohn’s work challenges many of the existing conceptions of both language and drawing. He argues that language involves an interaction between an expressive modality, meaning, and a grammar. Just as sign languages differ from gestures in that they use a vocabulary and grammar, “visual languages” differ from individual drawings because they have a vocabulary of patterned graphic representations and a grammar constraining the coherence of sequential images. Full visual languages primarily appear alongside written languages in comics of the world, though they also appear outside of comics, such as in sand drawings used by Australian Aboriginals. Just as spoken languages differ, so do visual languages: Japanese manga are written in “Japanese Visual Language” while American comics are written in “American Visual Language.” In addition, Cohn has argued that the development of visual languages may follow similar constraints as learning spoken and signed languages, and that most people do not learn how to draw proficiently because they do not acquire visual vocabularies within a critical period.

Cohn's primary research program with visual language theory emphasizes that a narrative structure operates as a “grammar” to sequential images analogously to syntactic structure in sentences. While narrative grammar uses a discourse level of information, its function and structure is similar to syntax in that it organizes categorical roles in hierarchic constituents in order to express meaning. Cohn’s work in cognitive neuroscience has suggested that manipulation of this narrative grammar elicits similar brain responses as manipulations of syntax in language (i.e. N400, P600, and Left Anterior Negativity effects).

In 2020, Cohn was awarded a Starting Grant from the European Research Council to study cross-cultural diversity in the structures of the visual languages used in comics around the world by building a multicultural corpus of annotated comics, and to examine the relationship of those structures to those in spoken languages.

Comic authorship
Cohn began working in the comic industry at age 14 by helping to run convention booths for Image Comics and Todd McFarlane Productions throughout his teenage years. Beyond illustrating his academic books, Cohn’s creative work appears in several graphic novels, like We the People: A Call to Take Back America (2004) with Thom Hartmann, and illustrations for academic works, including Ray Jackendoff’s A User’s Guide to Thought and Meaning (2012), and the comic strip “Chinese Room” with philosopher Daniel Dennett.

Selected works

References

External links
Visual Language Lab website
Visual Linguist Blog

Tilburg University faculty profile
The Guardian profile: How the visual language of comics could have its roots in the ice age 
The Language of Comics BBC Radio 4 interview with Michael Rosen

Living people
American cognitive scientists
1980 births
Comics scholars